The 2015 ITM Cup season was the tenth season of New Zealand's provincial rugby union competition since it turned professional in 2006. The regular season began on August 13, when Southland hosted Auckland. It involved the top fourteen rugby unions of New Zealand. For sponsorship reasons, the competition was known as the ITM Cup and it was the sixth season under the lead sponsor. The winner of the Championship, Hawke's Bay was promoted to the Premiership, the seventh placed Premiership team, Manawatu was relegated to the Championship.

Format
The ITM Cup standings were sorted by a competition points system. Four points were awarded to the winning team, a draw equaled two points, whilst a loss amounted to zero points. Unions could also win their side a respectable bonus point. To receive a bonus point, they must have scored four tries or more or lose by seven or fewer points or less. Each team was placed on their total points received. If necessary of a tiebreaker, when two or more teams finish on equal points, the union who defeated the other in a head-to-head got placed higher. In case of a draw between them, the side with the biggest points deferential margin got rights to be ranked above. If they were tied on points difference, it was then decided by a highest scored try count or a coin toss. This seeding format was implemented since the beginning of the 2006 competition.

The competition included a promotion-relegation process with the winner of the Championship receiving automatic promotion to the Premiership, replacing the seventh-placed team in the Premiership which was relegated to the Championship for the following year. The regular season consisted of two types of matches. The internal division matches were when each team played the other six unions in their division once, home or away. The cross-division matches were when each team played four teams from the other division, thus missing out on three teams, each from the opposite division. Each union played home or away games against teams from the other division, making a total of ten competition games for each union. The finals format allowed the top four teams from each division move on to the semi-finals. The top two division winners, based on table points, received a home semi-final. In the first round of the finals, the semi-finals, the second division winner hosted the third division winner, and the first division winner hosted the fourth division winner. The final was hosted by the top remaining seed.

Standings
Source: ITM Cup standings 2015

Standings progression

Regular season
The 2015 ITM Cup was played across nine weeks with every team playing one Wednesday night fixture in a double-up round where they played twice that week. The competition started on Thursday, August 13, with Southland taking on Auckland at Rugby Park Stadium. The last matchup of the beginning week saw Hawke's Bay host Northland for the competitions first Ranfurly Shield defense.

Week 1

Week 2

Week 3

Week 4

Week 5

Week 6

Week 7

Week 8

Week 9

Play-offs

Semi-finals

Finals

{| border="0" width="100%" 
|-
|

Statistics

Leading point scorers

Source: The weekly reviews of the matches published on provincial.rugby (see "Report" in the individual match scoring stats).

Leading try scorers

Source: The weekly reviews of the matches published on provincial.rugby (see "Report" in the individual match scoring stats).

Points by week

Source: ITM Cup Fixtures and Results 2015

Tries by week

Source: The weekly reviews of the matches published on provincial.rugby (see "Report" in the individual match scoring stats).

Sanctions

Ranfurly Shield

Pre-season challenges
Hawke's Bay won the Ranfurly Shield when they defeated Counties Manuaku in August 2014, and subsequently made four successful defenses. Hawke's Bay announced their first three defenses against Wairarapa Bush, Horowhenua-Kapiti, and Meads Cup winners Mid Canterbury after receiving six Heartland Championship offers.

In the first challenge, Hawke's Bay were missing players due to Super Rugby and international duties but managed to score forty-one unanswered second-half points which saw them safely retain the shield, winning 58–7 at McLean Park. Prop Jarvy Aoake scored from close range to open the scoring with their second try coming from fullback Zac Guildford and Tyrone Elkington-MacDonald kicked every conversion and penalty. Wairarapa Bush flanker Brock Price was awarded a try after chasing a kick downfield. Shannan Chase, Billy Ropiha, and Brendon O'Connor also scored tries with Jonah Lowe completing the scoring, in the final minute.

Again Hawke's Bay was missing players plus their coach also. Horowhenua-Kapiti were within four points with 15 minutes to play in Napier for the second Ranfurly Shield challenge. They dominated the opening half with Perry Hayman kicking three-from-three penalty shots at goal. Hawke's Bay although was in control with a dominant scrum and tries to Joseph Penitito and American Tony Lamborn. Sam Gardner scored for Horowhenua-Kapiti which brought the game back to within four points. But captain Antony Fox was then sent to the sin bin for a cynical infringement during a Hawke's Bay drive on his own try line which caused three Hawke's Bay penalties and tries to Shannan Chase, Tom Stanley and Mark Braidwood.

References

External links

2015
2015 in New Zealand rugby union
2015 rugby union tournaments for clubs